Grays Peak is a mountain in southeast British Columbia, Canada. It is located in Kokanee Glacier Provincial Park in the Kootenays, and is best known for being the mountain pictured on the label of Kokanee beer.


Location
Grays Peak is located at the south end of Kokanee Glacier Provincial Park, between the headwaters of Kokanee Creek and Coffee Creek.

Name
Grays Peak was named after brothers John Balfour Gray and Robert Hampton Gray (VC), who were born in Trail, BC, and grew up in Nelson, BC. Both brothers were killed in WWII. The name was adopted by the Geographic Board of Canada on 12 March 1946.

External links

 BC Parks, Map of Kokanee Glacier Provincial Park(PDF), (shows mountains, including Grays Peak)

References

Two-thousanders of British Columbia
Selkirk Mountains
Kootenay Land District